William "Will" Petschenig (born February 3, 1995) is a Canadian-Swiss professional ice hockey defenseman who is currently an unrestricted free agent. He was most recently contracted to play with the Kalamazoo Wings in the ECHL. He previously played with EHC Biel and Genève-Servette HC of the National League (NL) and with HC La Chaux-de-Fonds of the Swiss League (SL).

Playing career 
Petschenig was born in Manotick, Ontario. After representing the Upper Canada Cyclones and after a short stint with the Nepean Raiders, Petschenig joined the Cornwall Colts of the Central Canada Hockey League for the 2011-12 season. From 2012 to 2015, he spent time with the Oshawa Generals of the Ontario Hockey League (OHL) and helped win the J. Ross Robertson Cup in 2015. A broken arm forced him to sit out, when his team captured the Memorial Cup the same year. After the season, he was traded to the Saginaw Spirit, where he spent his final OHL season.

Petschenig signed his first professional contract on May 19, 2016, putting pen to paper on a two-year deal with Genève-Servette HC of the Swiss top-flight National League A (NLA).

On October 16, 2018, Petschenig was loaned to HC La Chaux-de-Fonds of the Swiss League. On December 7, 2018, Petschenig, was traded by Geneva to EHC Biel for Mauro Dufner. He appeared in 19 regular season games and 2 playoffs contests for Biel.

On August 26, 2019, Petschenig signed his first professional contract in North America, agreeing to a deal with the Fort Wayne Komets of the ECHL for the 2019–20 season. He registered 2 assists in 26 games before he was claimed off waivers by the Kalamazoo Wings on March 10, 2020, before the season was cancelled due to COVID-19.

Personal 
He received the All Weather Windows Humanitarian of the Year Award and the Dan Snyder Memorial Trophy for OHL Humanitarian of the Year in May 2016. Petschenig had created the programme "A Heart Like Mine" for kids who have lost a parent in memory of his father Dan, a former football player for the Toronto Argonauts who died in 2013.

Career statistics

Awards and honours

References

External links 
 

1995 births
EHC Biel players
Canadian ice hockey defencemen
Fort Wayne Komets players
Genève-Servette HC players
Ice hockey people from Ottawa
HC La Chaux-de-Fonds players
Living people
Oshawa Generals players
Saginaw Spirit players
Swiss ice hockey players
Canadian expatriate ice hockey players in Switzerland